Sounder is a 1972 American drama film directed by Martin Ritt and adapted by Lonne Elder III from the 1969 novel of the same name by William H. Armstrong. The story concerns an African-American sharecropper family in the Deep South, who struggle with economic and personal hardships during the Great Depression. It stars Cicely Tyson, Paul Winfield, and Kevin Hooks. Taj Mahal composed the film's blues-inspired soundtrack, and also appears in a supporting role.

The film was both a critical and box office success, and the National Board of Review ranked it as one of the Top 10 best films of 1972. Cicely Tyson and Paul Winfield both received Oscar nominations for their performances, and the film was nominated for Best Picture and Best Adapted Screenplay. Taj Mahal's score was nominated for a BAFTA and Grammy Award, and 13-year old Hooks earned a Golden Globe nomination for Most Promising Newcomer – Male.

In 2021, the film was selected for preservation in the United States National Film Registry by the Library of Congress as being "culturally, historically, or aesthetically significant".

Plot
In 1933, the Morgans are an African-American family living as sharecroppers in rural Louisiana, raising sugar cane for their white landlord. David Lee, the oldest son, is a bright boy who loves to hunt with his father, Nathan Lee, and their dog Sounder, but is only able to attend school sporadically in between helping his mother Rebecca on the farm. Nathan and David lose the raccoon they are hunting one evening, leaving the family without meat to eat, but the children awaken the next morning to the smell of ham cooking and happily eat it.
 
When they return home after a community baseball game, which Nathan helps his team win, they find the sheriff and his deputies waiting to arrest Nathan for stealing the ham from a nearby smokehouse. As they take him away, Sounder runs after their wagon and one of the deputies shoots him, though Nathan partially deflects the shot by kicking the gun. The injured Sounder runs away, and David cannot find him. He looks for him for days, but is unable to continue the search because with their father gone, he and his little brother and sister must help Rebecca farm and harvest the crops. Rebecca shares her faith with David that Sounder is alive and will return home eventually.
 
The family is restricted from visiting Nathan at the local jail while he awaits shipment to the work camp. Only David is allowed to visit, and he brings a chocolate cake that Rebecca baked for Nathan, and they enjoy a piece together despite their worries over not knowing where Nathan will be taken. Mrs. Boatwright, a sympathetic local woman who employs Rebecca to do her laundry and often gives the children books to read, promises David she will find out the location of the work camp Nathan has been taken to. When the sheriff refuses to tell her, she goes through his filing cabinet to find the information.
 
Despite the sheriff's threats, she tells the Morgan family that Nathan has been taken to the distant Wishbone prison camp and helps Rebecca plot the route there on the map. Sounder returns home, though he does not bark like he used to, and accompanies David on a long journey on foot to find the camp and try to visit his father.
 
David makes it to the Wishbone camp, but is unable to find Nathan and is ignored by the guards when he inquires after him. When he tries to ask the prisoners, a guard strikes his hand with an iron rod and chases him off the camp. On his journey home, he comes across a school with all black students, where the kind, outspoken teacher, Miss Camille, bandages his injured hand and has him stay at her house and attend class at the school for several days before he starts for home again. One night, she shares books from her collection about important African-American historical figures with him and reads to him from the work of W.E.B. DuBois.
 
After returning home, David longs to attend the distant school, but has largely given up on the dream when one day Sounder runs barking like he used to, to greet the returning Nathan, who was released from the work camp early after his leg was injured in a dynamite explosion. Seeing his father's depleted strength, David resolves to stay and work the farm in his place, but after learning of the school, Nathan is adamant that David go to attend it full-time. They have a heart-to-heart about how Nathan wishes for his children to escape the dead-end life of sharecropping and aspire to better things, and the next day, Rebecca and his siblings cheerfully see David off as he and Nathan head into town to buy clothes and school supplies, accompanied by Sounder.

Cast 

 Cicely Tyson as Rebecca Morgan
 Paul Winfield as Nathan Lee Morgan
 Kevin Hooks as David Lee Morgan
 Carmen Matthews as Mrs. Rita Boatwright
 Taj Mahal as Ike Phillips
 James Best as Sheriff Charlie Young
 Eric Hooks as Earl Morgan
 Yvonne Jarrell as Josie Mae Morgan
 Janet MacLachlan as Camille Johnson 
 Sylvia "Kuumba" Williams as Harriet
 Ted Airhart as Mr. Perkins
 Richard Durham as Perkins' Foreman 
 Jerry Leggio as Prison Guard
 Spencer Bradford as Clarence
 Judge William Thomas Bennett as Judge
 Reverend Thomas N. Phillips as Minister Garth

Soundtrack 
Taj Mahal recorded a soundtrack to the film, released in 1972 by Columbia Records. According to music journalist Robert Christgau, it was "the first soundtrack ever patterned after a field recording", featuring a "suite/montage/succession of hums, moans, claps, and plucked fragments", all performed in the key of the gospel blues song "Needed Time" by Lightnin' Hopkins. Fellow critic Greil Marcus regarded it as Mahal's "most eloquent music", although Christgau said "even Greil doesn't know anybody who agrees. I've always regarded field recordings as study aids myself." He gave the soundtrack album a C-plus in Christgau's Record Guide: Rock Albums of the Seventies (1981).

Release
Sounder opened September 24, 1972 at the Embassy and Plaza theaters in New York City.

Home media
When the film was released on VHS, Paramount Home Video assumed distribution rights. Sterling Entertainment currently has DVD distribution rights.

Reception

Critical reception
Sounder received critical acclaim, with reviewers praising it as a welcome antidote to the contemporaneous wave of black films, most of which were considered of low quality and budget and exploitative. The film's depiction of a loving family was hailed as a banner accomplishment for black filmmakers and audiences. Variety wrote that the picture had been "for good or ill, singled out to test whether the black audience will respond to serious films about the black experience rather than the 'super black' exploitation features."

Some of Sounder'''s success was due to its innovative marketing strategy. Fox focused on group sales in major cities and targeted religious organizations and schools. Radnitz personally visited 35 cities and held over 500 screenings, with 60 simultaneous sneak previews held in New York City. The religious establishment came out in favor of the film, with an endorsement by the Catholic Film Office and a study guide for religious educators created by the National Council of Churches. The Variety article noted that Fox wrote a study guide, prepared by Dr. Roscoe Brown, Jr., director of Afro-American Affairs at New York University. 20th Century Fox spent over $1 million promoting the film, according to Variety.

John Simon wrote "Sounder is a rare honest movie about people who work the soil under conditions of extreme rigor. Sounder is also a rare honest Hollywood movie about blacks, making it virtually unique'.

Based on 20 reviews, Sounder holds a 90% "Fresh" score (and an average of 7.7/10) on Rotten Tomatoes. In his Family Guide to Movies on Video, Henry Herx wrote: "Sounder captures the humanity of [its] characters and a fine, distanced sense of its sleepy Southern locale. The movie earns a deep emotional response from its audience because its [appealing] story and characters are believable. Not only a valid examination of the black experience in America, it is also a fine family experience." He added that the boy's search for his father "provides additional drama". Film critic Roger Ebert gave the film four stars out of four, stating that "This is a film for the family to see." Both Gene Siskel and Ebert placed the film on their 10-best lists of 1972.

Box office
Despite popular skepticism that the film would not be a financial success, and the belief that "the black film market is exclusively an action and exploitation market", the picture was a major box-office hit. The film grossed $27,045 from 2 theaters in its opening week and grossed 30% more the following week. Made for less than $1 million, it grossed just under $17 million, generating $9 million of theatrical rentals in the United States and Canada in 1973, the 10th highest-grossing film of 1972.

Awards and nominationsSounder was the first film to feature Oscar-nominated performances by two black actors, with Winfield nominated for Best Actor and Tyson for Best Actress. The next film with black actors receiving nominations for Best Actor and Best Actress was What's Love Got to Do with It in 1993, with Laurence Fishburne and Angela Bassett. The third film to achieve this was Ma Rainey's Black Bottom in 2020, with Chadwick Boseman and Viola Davis.

Sequel
The sequel Part 2, Sounder was released in 1976. Taj Mahal and Ted Airhart were the only returning cast members from the first film.

Remake
In 2003, Wonderful World of Disney'' aired a new film adaptation, reuniting two actors from the original. Kevin Hooks (who played the son) directed, and Paul Winfield (who played the father) played the role of the teacher. Walt Disney Home Video has released the television version on DVD.

See also
 List of American films of 1972

Notes

References

External links
 
 
 
 
 

1972 films
1972 drama films
1970s coming-of-age drama films
20th Century Fox films
American historical drama films
American coming-of-age drama films
African-American drama films
African-American films
1970s English-language films
Films about farmers
Films based on children's books
Films based on American novels
Films directed by Martin Ritt
Films set on farms
Films set in Louisiana
Films set in the 1930s
Films shot in Louisiana
Great Depression films
United States National Film Registry films
1970s American films